The Churches Complex in Jebel Ali Village, Dubai, United Arab Emirates, is an area for a number of churches and temples of different religious denominations, especially Christian denominations. It is located immediately to south of the Al Muntazah residential neighbourhood complex.

Churches and temples
Churches and temples in the complex include:

 St Francis of Assisi Catholic Church
 Christ Church Jebel Ali Anglican Church.
 Dubai Evangelical Church Centre (DECC)
 St Mina Copts Orthodox Church
 The Mar Thoma Parish church
 Mor Ignatius Jacobite Syrian Orthodox Cathedral
 Archdiocese Of Roum Orthodox Church
 Gurunanak Darbar Dubai Sikh Temple
Hindu Temple, Jebel Ali

Gallery

Location and transport
The Churches Complex is close to the Ibn Battuta Mall to the north. The nearest Dubai Metro station is the Energy metro station on the Red Line to the west. Both are connected to the complex by the F44 feeder bus service.

References

External links
 

Year of establishment missing
Churches Complax
Geography of Dubai